The Flanginian School was a Greek educational institution that operated in Venice, Italy, from 1664-1665 to 1905. The Flanginian produced several teachers that contributed to the modern Greek Enlightenment of the 17th and 18th centuries.

Background
The Greek community in Venice, dating from the Byzantine era, had become the largest foreign community in the city during the end of the 16th century, numbering between 4,000 and 5,000, mostly concentrated in the Castello district (sestiere). Moreover, it was one of the economically strongest Greek communities of that time outside the Ottoman Empire.

History
In 1626 a wealthy Greek merchant who lived in Venice, Thomas Flanginis, offered to the community a large sum of money for the foundation of a new school. The project for the construction of the school was entrusted to the famous Venetian architect Baldassare Longhena. Finally, the Flanginian school, named after its sponsor, started to function in 1664 and its students came from various Greek-populated regions.

The teaching staff included famous Greek scholars and representatives of the modern Greek Enlightenment, like Theophilos Korydaleus, Eugenios Voulgaris, Ioannis Chalkeus and Ioannis Patoussas.
The curriculum included advanced philosophy, rhetorics, philology and logic. The Flanginian produced a total of 550 graduates during the 214 years of its existence (1665–1797 and 1823–1905). Its graduates had the opportunity to continue their studies at Padua University, in order to obtain a doctoral degree. The school began to decline after the dissolution of the Venetian Republic (1797), and was finally closed down in 1905.

Literature
The school is perhaps best remembered for an anthology of prose and poetry entitled Flowers of Piety (1708), which was composed by the students of the school, made up of epigrams, both in ancient Greek and Latin, Sapphic odes, Italian sonnets, and, most significantly, prose and verse compositions in (Demotic) modern Greek. As such it offers the first surviving Demotic Greek poetry following the termination of the Cretan Renaissance. Additional works composed by the staff of the Flanginian were: "Greece’s Homage to the Venetian Senate", as well as a literary encyclopedia by Ioannis Patousas composed in four volumes, which was a valuable resource for Greek schools operating in the Ottoman Empire.

Location
The school was located in the Campo dei Greci, near the Greek Orthodox church of Saint George. Today the building of the Flanginian School houses the Hellenic Institute of Byzantine and Post-Byzantine Studies in Venice. The building was conserved at the initiative of Sophia Antoniadis.

References

External links

Buildings and structures in Castello, Venice
Defunct schools in Italy
Education in Venice
Greek diaspora in Europe
Modern Greek Enlightenment
1664 establishments in the Republic of Venice
Educational institutions established in the 1660s
Educational institutions disestablished in 1905